Sarah Simms is a supporting character in the DC Universe and a romantic love interest of Cyborg.

Fictional character biography
Vic Stone, after being rejected by his lover/girlfriend because of his disfiguring implantswarooding about h child'sow he cannot have a normal life and no one outside of his teammates in the Teen Titans could stand being around him.

In the midst of this gloom, he was struck by a baseball. The child nervously asked for his ball and Vic handed it back, forgetting the child could see his metallic hand. To his surprise, the boy did not recoil at the sight of him, but instead marveled at Vic's metal prosthetics, and revealed he had a mundane, regular prosthetic arm of standard plastic design. The boy called over the rest of his child p ych was overseen by Sarah Simms, a teacher at West Side School for the Handicapped. The children immediately idolized Vic with his fancy parts and exciting life while he, encouraged by this heartening experience, became close friends with Sarah red the idea of a strong romantic relationship, yet both were rather shy about asking for fear of placing a rift between their already strong and close platonic friendship.

Vic and Sarah's friendship was shaken when she was kidnapped by Deathstroke the Terminator in an attempt to get to the Titans. Vic felt responsible, and Sarah was upset by the event. Vic and Sarah later came to terms with this and resumed their close friendship.

Later, Sarah Simms was accosted on the street by Mark Wright, who persisted in claiming to be her fiancé after she told him repeatedly that they were never more than friends and co-workers. Mark dragged Sarah into a nearby sporting goods store, which he took over at gunpoint, wounding a cashier who tried to stop him. Using a rifle from the store merchandise, Mark held off the police, who surrounded the shop, while Sarah took advantage of his distraction to place a phone call to Titans Tower. Cyborg, Changeling, and Raven, the only Titans on hand at the moment, arrived almost immediately, but their initial efforts to enter the store and disarm Mark were met with failure. Finally, confused and surrounded, Mark put down his weapon and collapsed into Raven's arms, surrendering.

Sarah's life was without much incident following her hostage situation with Mark Wright. She continued her friendship with Vic, and even attended Donna Troy's wedding as his date.

Following that, Vic's adventures left him little time for Sarah. Meanwhile, a new man entered her life: a coworker at the West Side School for the Handicapped by the name of Gary Sellers. Sarah and Gary did not plan on a relationship, but found themselves strongly falling in love. Sarah initially was hesitant to tell Vic, and he found out by accident. He was angry at first, but later accepted they were not meant to have a true and deep romantic relationship — just a close and strong friendship.

Eventually, Gary left Sarah and she found herself single again. She romantically flirted with the idea of a romantic relationship with Joe Wilson (Jericho), but nothing ever came of it.

Sarah Simms still remains a friend to Vic Stone and the Titans.

In The New Teen Titans: "Games", Sarah is killed by a bomb set by the book's mastermind. The book is stated to be outside the normal New Teen Titans continuity, so Sarah's ultimate fate remains unknown.

Additional notes
Marv Wolfman, on the possibility of a Vic/Sarah Simms romance: "Not necessarily. At first, I thought of it. And then decided there was nothing wrong with a good healthy friendship that isn't based on a sex. I received a letter that sort of helped me change my mind, from a black leader who felt that we had seen a lot of interracial relationships, but we haven't seen that many good, solid black-black relationships to show that a black hero doesn't always go together with a white heroine and vice versa. And that sort of got me thinking. That came very early in the relationship, that it made a lot more sense in terms of their needs to be very good friends on a platonic friendship level. He has no girlfriend who he is totally in love with in a sexual way at this time. He's just very good friends with her, And that in itself is a slightly different relationship".

In other media
 Sarah Simms appears in the episode "The Seeds of Doom", of The Super Powers Team: Galactic Guardians as teacher of handicapped children.
 In the Teen Titans episode "Cyborg the Barbarian", Cyborg is stranded in 3000 BC by a magic spell. While stuck in the past, he meets and falls in love with the warrior woman Sarasim (voiced by Kimberly Brooks), whose name is an homage to Sarah and a possible ancestor.

Miscellaneous
 Sarah also appears in the Teen Titans Go! comics which are based on the animated series. She is like her comic counterpart and has a very similar introduction issue. She also teaches handicapped children as a volunteer counselor. She leaves Cyborg briefly in issue #27 after a misunderstanding paired with Jinx's hostility toward her for being Cyborg's girlfriend. Sarah reunited with Cyborg in issue #39, where she and Cyborg go on a double date with Starfire and Robin. It is not known at this point what caused her to go back to Cyborg, but both she and Starfire bore roses. In issue #45, she, Beast Boy and Cyborg become supervisors of the children on a camping trip. The first portion of the story has Beast Boy telling his origin around the campfire. The second portion, which takes place later in the evening from the first story, has Cyborg telling Sarah his origin prior to joining the Titans. Cyborg tells her that he has strong feelings for her, and he believes that they have "met in another life". She mentions that she will be attending college later in the fall, with Cyborg mentioning that he will keep in touch through cellphone, e-mail and text, as he jokingly refers to himself as a walking communication center. The story ends with them embracing, and Beast Boy teasing them.

Appearances
 Issue #3: Lame
 Issue #13: What Time Is It, Mr. Wolf?
 Issue #20: Secret Moves
 Issue #27: Love is a Battlefield
 Issue #39: Stupid Cupid
 Issue #45: Biography of a Beast Boy/Cyborg's Story

References

Comics characters introduced in 1981
DC Comics female characters
Fictional schoolteachers
Characters created by Marv Wolfman